Emmanuele Sembroni (born 27 January 1988) is an Italian footballer who most recently played as a defender for New York Cosmos in the National Independent Soccer Association.

Sembroni joined Lupa Roma from Chiasso on 4 January 2016 for free.

References

External links
 Pescara Calcio profile
 
 salernonotizie.net
 

1988 births
Living people
Italian footballers
Delfino Pescara 1936 players
U.S. Pergolettese 1932 players
New York Cosmos B players
New York Cosmos (2010) players
Serie B players
Serie C players
National Premier Soccer League players
Italy youth international footballers
Association football defenders